Sanan Khan Qureshi (is a current chairman of a separatists political organization Jeay Sindh Qaumi Mahaz. Sanan leads the JSQM in 2012 after the death of his father Bashir Ahmed Qureshi.

Early life
Sunan matriculated privately and he completed his intermediate exams at the Government Degree College in Ratodero.

Political career
After the mysterious death of his father and JSQM chairman Bashir Ahmed Qureshi in 2012, Sanan khan lead the party as chairman, he was elected unopposed on 9 September 2012 in intraparty elections. When sanan elected as a chairman he was only 19 years old, that time he said that "My father wanted me to study". Senior party leaders criticized him as a self-appointed chairman and called this decision as an autocratic rule.

Imprisonment
After a violent protest at Bahira Town Karachi's main gate, On June 9, 2021, police arrested Sanan Khan Qureshi on terrorism charges. He was released after 40 days on Jul 19,2021.

References

People from Larkana District
Sindhi politicians
Year of birth missing (living people)
Living people